The Three Aunts (German: Die drei Tanten) is a 1921 German silent film directed by Rudolf Biebrach and starring Lotte Neumann, Olga Limburg and Johannes Riemann.

Cast
 Lotte Neumann as Ellen Hegelund
 Johannes Riemann as Erik von Straaten
 Olga Limburg as Aunt
 Josefine Dora as Aunt
 Emmy Wyda as Aunt
 Charles Puffy
 Willi Allen
 Adolf Klein as Graf Hegelund 
 Rosa Valetti

References

Bibliography
 Grange, William. Cultural Chronicle of the Weimar Republic. Scarecrow Press, 2008.

External links

1921 films
Films of the Weimar Republic
German silent feature films
Films directed by Rudolf Biebrach
German black-and-white films